Perfluorooctanoic acid (PFOA; conjugate base perfluorooctanoate; also known colloquially as C8, for its 8 carbon chain structure) is a perfluorinated carboxylic acid produced and used worldwide as an industrial surfactant in chemical processes and as a material feedstock. PFOA is considered a surfactant, or fluorosurfactant, due to its chemical structure, which consists of a perfluorinated, n-octyl "tail group" and a carboxylate "head group". The head group can be described as hydrophilic while the fluorocarbon tail is both hydrophobic and lipophobic.

PFOA is one of many synthetic organofluorine compounds collectively known as per- and polyfluoroalkyl substances (PFASs).

PFOA is used in several industrial applications, including carpeting, upholstery, apparel, floor wax, textiles, fire fighting foam and sealants. PFOA serves as a surfactant in the emulsion polymerization of fluoropolymers and as a building block for the synthesis of perfluoroalkyl-substituted compounds, polymers, and polymeric materials. PFOA has been manufactured since the 1940s in industrial quantities. It is also formed by the degradation of precursors such as some fluorotelomers. PFOA is used as a surfactant because it can lower the surface tension of water more than hydrocarbon surfactants while having exceptional stability due to having perfluoroalkyl tail group. The stability of PFOA is desired industrially but is a cause of concern environmentally.

A study of workers living near a DuPont Teflon plant found an association between PFOA exposure and two kinds of cancer as well as four other diseases. A positive exposure-response trend for kidney cancer is supported by many studies. PFOA has been detected in the blood of more than 98% of the general US population in the low and sub-parts per billion (ppb) range, and levels are higher in chemical plant employees and surrounding subpopulations. How general populations are exposed to PFOA is not completely understood. PFOA has been detected in industrial waste, stain-resistant carpets, carpet-cleaning liquids, house dust, microwave popcorn bags, water, food, and Teflon (PTFE) products.

As a result of a class-action lawsuit and community settlement with DuPont, three epidemiologists conducted studies on the population surrounding a chemical plant that was exposed to PFOA at levels greater than in the general population. Studies have found correlation between high PFOA exposure and six health outcomes: kidney cancer, testicular cancer, ulcerative colitis, thyroid disease, hypercholesterolemia (high cholesterol), and pregnancy-induced hypertension.

The primary manufacturer of PFOS, the 3M Company (known as Minnesota Mining and Manufacturing Company from 1902 to 2002), began a production phase-out in 2002 in response to concerns expressed by the United States Environmental Protection Agency (EPA). Eight other companies agreed to gradually phase out the manufacturing of the chemical by 2015.

By 2014, EPA had listed PFOA and perfluorooctanesulfonates (salts of perfluorooctanesulfonic acid, PFOS) as emergent contaminants:

History 
3M (then the Minnesota Mining and Manufacturing Company) began producing PFOA by electrochemical fluorination in 1947. Starting in 1951, DuPont purchased PFOA from 3M for use in the manufacturing of specific fluoropolymers—commercially branded as Teflon, but DuPont internally referred to the material as C8.

In 1968, organofluorine content was detected in the blood serum of consumers, and in 1976 it was suggested to be PFOA or a related compound such as PFOS.

In 1999, EPA ordered companies to examine the effects of perfluorinated chemicals after receiving data on the global distribution and toxicity of PFOS. For these reasons, and EPA pressure, in May 2000, 3M announced the phaseout of the production of PFOA, PFOS, and PFOS-related products—the company's best-selling repellent. 3M stated that they would have made the same decision regardless of EPA pressure.

Because of the 3M phaseout, in 2002, DuPont built its own plant in Fayetteville, North Carolina, to manufacture the chemical. The chemical has received attention due to litigation from the PFOA-contaminated community around DuPont's Washington Works facility in Washington, West Virginia, along with EPA focus. In 2004, ChemRisk—an "industry risk assessor" that had been contracted by Dupont, reported that over 1.7 million pounds of C8 had been "dumped, poured and released" into the environment from Dupont's Parkersburg, West Virginia-based Washington Works plant between 1951 and 2003.

Research on PFOA has demonstrated ubiquity, animal-based toxicity, and some associations with human health parameters and potential health effects. Additionally, advances in analytical chemistry in recent years have allowed the routine detection of low- and sub-parts per billion levels of PFOA in a variety of substances. In 2013, Gore-Tex eliminated the use of PFOAs in the manufacture of its weatherproof functional fabrics. Major companies producing PFOA signed with the Global PFOA Stewardship Program with the goal of elimination of PFOA by 2015. Since then it has been eliminated from the production of non-stick materials used in cookware. GenX has been introduced as a replacement for PFOA, but in a 2015 study which tested the effects on rats, GenX caused many of the same health problems as PFOA, but required much higher concentrations. This is because GenX (C3) is a short chain alternative to PFOA. GenX also has a significantly shorter half-life than PFOA so it is not as bio-persistent as PFOA or other long chain perfluorinated chemicals.

Robert Bilott investigation
In the fall of 2000, lawyer Robert Bilott, a partner at Taft Stettinius & Hollister, won a court order forcing DuPont to share all documentation related to PFOA. This included 110,000 files, consisting of confidential studies and reports conducted by DuPont scientists over decades. By 1993, DuPont understood that "PFOA caused cancerous testicular, pancreatic and liver tumors in lab animals" and the company began to investigate alternatives. However, because products manufactured with PFOA were such an integral part of DuPont's earnings, $1 billion in annual profit, they chose to continue using PFOA. Bilott learned that both "3M and DuPont had been conducting secret medical studies on PFOA for more than four decades", and by 1961 DuPont was aware of hepatomegaly in mice fed with PFOA. Later research eventually found that PFOA had an outsized effect based on gender on several negative health outcomes in mice that had been exposed to the chemical. The PFOA exposure in these mice led to a modification of genetic expression. This led to the development of fatty tissue which caused the exposed mice to develop varying rates of hypercholesterolemia (high cholesterol). The impact of PFOA on this health outcome varied greatly between mice of different genotypes across relevant parts of the genome. Also, notably, female mice across all genotypes saw significantly higher rates and more severe cases of hypercholesterolemia.

Bilott exposed how DuPont had been knowingly polluting water with PFOAs in Parkersburg, West Virginia, since the 1980s. In the 1980s and 1990s, researchers investigated the toxicity of PFOA.

For his work in the exposure of the contamination, lawyer Robert Bilott has received several awards including The Right Livelihood Award in 2017. This battle with DuPont is featured in the documentary The Devil We Know, which premiered at the Sundance Film Festival in 2018, and Dark Waters, directed by Todd Haynes.

Synthesis 
PFOA has two main synthesis routes, electrochemical fluorination (ECF) and telomerization. The ECF route sees octanoyl chloride (the acid chloride of octanoic acid) reacted with hydrofluoric acid. Multiple products are formed by ECF with the target acid fluoride F(CF2)7COF being produced as only 10–15% of the yield, while the main products are perfluorinated cyclic ether isomers, including FC-75. This acid fluoride is hydrolyzed to yield PFOA as a mixture of straight-chain (78%), terminally branched (13%), and internally branched (9%) molecules, because ECF induces rearrangements the carbon tail of the acid chloride. ECF also results in production wastes. 3M synthesized ECF PFOA at their Cottage Grove, Minnesota facility from 1947 to 2002 and was the world's largest producer. ECF production continues on a smaller scale in Europe and Asia.

PFOA is also synthesized by the telomerization represented below, where the telogen is the organoiodine compound and the taxogen is the tetrafluoroethylene. Each step is an addition reaction where the carbon-iodine bond of the telogen is added across the carbon-carbon double bond of the unsaturated taxogen, resulting in the formation of a new telogen.

CF3CF2I + F2C=CF2 → CF3CF2CF2CF2I

CF3(CF2)3I + F2C=CF2 → CF3(CF2)5I

CF3(CF2)5I + F2C=CF2 → CF3(CF2)7I

The product is oxidized by SO3 to form PFOA. Since each addition produces a new teleomer, fluorotelomers like these form with varying length chains containing an even number of carbon atoms, depending on reaction conditions. Typically, most products within will contain between two and six taxogens (that is, from CF3(CF2)5I to CF3(CF2)13I). After oxidation, distillation is used to separate PFOA from the other perfluorinated carboxylic acids. The telomerization synthesis of PFOA was pioneered by DuPont, and is not well suited to the laboratory. PFOA formed by telomerization is completely linear, in contrast to the mixture of structures formed by ECF.

Applications 
PFOA has widespread applications. In 1976, PFOA was reported as a water and oil repellent "in fabrics and leather and in the production of floor waxes and waxed papers"; however, it is believed that paper is no longer treated with perfluorinated compounds, but with fluorotelomers with less than 0.1% PFOA. The compound is also used in "insulators for electric wires, planar etching of fused silica", fire fighting foam, and outdoor clothing. As a protonated species, the acid form of PFOA was the most widely used perfluorocarboxylic acid used as a reactive intermediate in the production of fluoroacrylic esters.

As a salt, its dominant use is as an emulsifier for the emulsion polymerization of fluoropolymers such as PTFE, polyvinylidene fluoride, and fluoroelastomers. For this use, 3M subsidiary Dyneon has a replacement emulsifer despite DuPont stating PFOA is an "essential processing aid". In the past PFOA was used in the production of Gore-Tex as it is PTFE-based. In PTFE processing, PFOA is in aqueous solution and forms micelles that contain tetrafluoroethylene and the growing polymer. PFOA can be used to stabilize fluoropolymer and fluoroelastomer suspensions before further industrial processing and in ion-pair reversed-phase liquid chromatography it can act as an extraction agent. PFOA also finds uses in electronic products and as an industrial fluorosurfactant.

In a 2009 EPA study of 116 products, purchased between March 2007 and May 2008 and found to contain at least 0.01% fluorine by weight, the concentrations of PFOA were determined. Concentrations shown below range from not detected, or ND, (with the detection limit in parenthesis) to 6750 with concentrations in nanograms of PFOA per gram of sample (parts per billion) unless stated otherwise.

Global occurrence and sources 
PFOA contaminates every continent. Two of the most common types (PFOS and PFOA) were phased out of production in the United States (US) in 2002 and 2015 respectively, but are still present in some imported products. PFOA and PFOS are found in every American person's blood stream in the parts per billion range, though those concentrations have decreased by 70% for PFOA and 84% for PFOS between 1999 and 2014, which coincides with the end of the production and phase out of PFOA and PFOS in the US. PFOA has been detected in the central Pacific Ocean at low parts per quadrillion ranges, and at low parts per trillion (ppt) levels in coastal waters. Due to the surfactant nature of PFOA, it has been found to concentrate in the top layers of ocean water. PFOA is detected widely in surface waters, and is present in numerous mammals, fish, and bird species. PFOA is in the blood or vital organs of Atlantic salmon, swordfish, striped mullet, gray seals, common cormorants, Alaskan polar bears, brown pelicans, sea turtles, sea eagles, Midwestern bald eagles, California sea lions and Laysan albatrosses on Sand Island, a wildlife refuge on Midway Atoll, in the middle of the North Pacific Ocean, about halfway between North America and Asia. Because PFAS are ubiquitous in households, consumer products, food, and the environment generally, some trace levels reflecting this ubiquitous broad use of these compounds will make their way into the wastewater and solid waste streams.

However, wildlife has much less PFOA than humans, unlike PFOS and other longer perfluorinated carboxylic acids; in wildlife, PFOA is not as bioaccumulative as longer perfluorinated carboxylic acids. Municipal wastewater and landfill leachates are considered as important sources of PFOA to the environment,

Most industrialized nations have average PFOA blood serum levels ranging from 2 to 8 parts per billion; the highest consumer sub-population identified was in Korea—with about 60 parts per billion. In Peru, Vietnam, and Afghanistan blood serum levels have been recorded to be below one part per billion. In 2003–2004 99.7% of Americans had detectable PFOA in their serum with an average of about 4 parts per billion, and concentrations of PFOA in US serum have declined by 25% in recent years. Despite a decrease in PFOA, the longer perfluorinated carboxylic acid PFNA is increasing in the blood of US consumers. PFAS are also found in paper mill residuals, digestates, composts, and soils. Given the ubiquity of PFAS, and the comparative background levels which may be found in wastewater, biosolids, and leachates, setting requirements near analytical detection limits on these sources may not provide a discernable benefit to protecting public health.

Industrial sources 
PFOA is released directly from industrial sites. For example, the estimate for the DuPont Washington Works facility is a total PFOA emissions of 80,000 pounds (lbs) in 2000 and 1,700 pounds in 2004. A 2006 study, with two of four authors being DuPont employees, estimated about 80% of historical perfluorocarboxylate emissions were released to the environment from fluoropolymer manufacture and use. PFOA can be measured in water from industrial sites other than fluorochemical plants. PFOA has also been detected in emissions from the carpet industry, paper and electronics industries. The most important emission sources are carpet and textile protection products, as well as fire-fighting foams.

Precursors 

PFOA can form as a breakdown product from a variety of precursor molecules. In fact, the main products of the fluorotelomer industry, fluorotelomer-based polymers, have been shown to degrade to form PFOA and related compounds, with half-lives of decades, both biotically and by simple abiotic reaction with water. It has been argued that fluorotelomer-based polymers already produced might be major sources of PFOA globally for decades to come. Other precursors that degrade to PFOA include 8:2 fluorotelomer alcohol (F(CF2)8CH2CH2OH), polyfluoroalkyl phosphate surfactants (PAPS), and possibly N-EtFOSE alcohol (F(CF2)8SO2N(Et)CH2CH2OH). When PTFE (Teflon) is degraded by heat (pyrolysis) it can form PFOA as a minor product. The Organisation for Economic Co-operation and Development (OECD) has compiled a list of 615 chemicals that have the potential to break down into perfluorocarboxylic acids (PFCA) including PFOA. However, not all 615 have the potential to break down to form PFOA.

A majority of waste water treatment plants (WWTPs) that have been tested output more PFOA than is input, and this increased output has been attributed to the biodegradation of fluorotelomer alcohols. A current PFOA precursor concern are fluorotelomer-based polymers; fluorotelomer alcohols attached to hydrocarbon backbones via ester linkages may detach and be free to biodegrade to PFOA.

Sources to people 
Food, drinking water, outdoor air, indoor air, dust, and food packagings are all implicated as sources of PFOA to people. However, it is unclear which exposure routes dominate because of data gaps. When water is a source, blood levels are approximately 100 times higher than drinking water levels.

People who lived in the PFOA-contaminated area around DuPont's Washington Works facility were found to have higher levels of PFOA in their blood from drinking water. The highest PFOA levels in drinking water were found in the Little Hocking water system, with an average concentration of 3.55 parts per billion during 2002–2005. Individuals who drank more tap water, ate locally grown fruits and vegetables, or ate local meat, were all associated with having higher PFOA levels. Residents who used water carbon filter systems had lower PFOA levels.

Food contact surfaces 

PFOA is also formed as an unintended byproduct in the production of fluorotelomers and is present in finished goods treated with fluorotelomers, including those intended for food contact. Fluorotelomers are applied to food contact papers because they are lipophobic: they prevent oil from soaking into the paper from fatty foods. Also, fluorotelomers can be metabolized into PFOA. In a U.S. Food and Drug Administration (USFDA) study, lipophobic fluorotelomer-based paper coatings (which can be applied to food contact paper in the concentration range of 0.4%) were found to contain 88,000–160,000 parts per billion PFOA before application, while the oil from microwave popcorn bags contained 6–290 parts per billion PFOA after heating. Toxicologists estimate that microwave popcorn could account for about 20% of the PFOA levels measured in an individual consuming 10 bags a year if 1% of the fluorotelomers are metabolized to PFOA.

In 2008 as news stories began to raise concerns about PFOA in microwaved popcorn, Dan Turner, DuPont's global public relations chief, said, "I serve microwave popcorn to my three-year-old." Five years later, journalist Peter Laufer wrote to Turner to ask if his child was still eating microwave popcorn. "I am not going to comment on such a personal inquiry", Turner replied.

Fluorotelomer coatings are used in fast food wrappers, candy wrappers, and pizza box liners. PAPS, a type of paper fluorotelomer coating, and PFOA precursor, is also used in food contact papers.

Despite DuPont's asserting that "cookware coated with DuPont Teflon non-stick coatings does not contain PFOA", residual PFOA was also detected in finished PTFE products including PTFE cookware (4–75 parts per billion). However, PFOA levels ranged from undetectable (<1.5) to 4.3 parts per billion in a more recent study. Also, non-stick cookware is heated—which should volatilize PFOA; PTFE products that are not heated, such as PTFE sealant tape, had higher (1800 parts per billion) levels detected. Overall, PTFE cookware is considered an insignificant exposure pathway to PFOA.

Potential path: sludge to food 
PFOA and PFOS were detected in "very high" (low parts per million) levels in agricultural fields for grazing beef cattle and crops around Decatur, Alabama. The approximately 5000 acres of land were fertilized with "treated municipal sewage sludge, or biosolids". PFOA was also detected in fodder grass grown in these soils and the blood of the cattle feeding on this grass. The water treatment plant received process wastewater from a nearby perfluorochemical manufacturing plant. 3M says they managed their own wastes, but Daikin America "discharged process wastewater to the municipal waste treatment plant". If traced to meat, it would be the first time perfluorochemicals were traced from sludge to food. However, the USDA reported—with a detection limits of 20 parts per billion—non-detectable levels for both PFOA and PFOS in cattle muscle tissue.

Household dust 
PFOA is frequently found in household dust, making it an important exposure route for adults, but more substantially, children. Children have higher exposures to PFOA through dust compared to adults. Hand-to-mouth contact and proximity to high concentrations of dust make them more susceptible to ingestion, and increases PFOA exposure. One study showed significant positive associations were recognized between dust ingestion and PFOA serum concentrations. However, an alternate study found exposure due to dust ingestion was associated with minimal risk.

Regulatory status

Drinking water and products 
In the United States there are no federal drinking water standards for PFOA or PFOS as of early 2021. EPA began requiring public water systems to monitor for PFOA and PFOS in 2012, and published drinking water health advisories, which are non-regulatory technical documents, in 2016. The lifetime health advisories and health effects support documents assist federal, state, tribal, and local officials and managers of drinking water systems in protecting public health when these chemicals are present in drinking water. The levels of PFOS and PFOA concentrations under which adverse health effects are not anticipated to occur over a lifetime of exposure are 0.07 ppb (70 ppt). In March 2021 EPA announced that it would develop a National Primary Drinking Water Regulation for these contaminants.

The State of New Jersey published drinking water standards for PFOA and PFOS in 2020. A standard for PFNA was published in 2018. This was the first state to publish PFAS standards in the absence of federal regulations. See U.S. state government actions.

In 2018 the State of New York adopted drinking water standards of 10 ppt for PFOA and 10 ppt for PFOS, the most stringent such standards in the United States. The standards apply to public water systems and took effect in 2019 after a public comment period.

Using information gained through a Freedom of Information Act request, in May 2018 it was learned that January 2018 emails between the EPA, the Office of Management and Budget, the Department of Defense, and the Department of Health and Human Services showed an effort to suppress the release of a draft report on the toxicology of PFOS and PFOA done by the Agency for Toxic Substances and Disease Registry. The report found that these chemicals endanger human health at a far lower level than EPA has previously called safe. After media accounts of the effort surfaced, the regional EPA administrator for Colorado denied that EPA had anything to do with suppressing the report. The report was finally released on June 21, 2018.

The new ATSDR analysis derives provisional Minimal Risk Levels (MRLs) of 3x10−6 mg/kg/day for PFOA and 2x10−6 mg/kg/day for PFOS during intermediate exposure. The European Food Safety Authority opinion sets a provisional tolerable weekly intake (TWI) of 6 x10−6 mg/kg body weight per week for PFOA.

California and food packaging 
An attempt to regulate PFOA in food packaging occurred in the US state of California in 2008. A bill, sponsored by State Senator Ellen Corbett and the Environmental Working Group, was passed in the house and senate that would have banned PFOA, PFOS, and seven or more related fluorinated carbon compounds in food packaging starting in 2010, but the bill was vetoed by Governor Schwarzenegger. The bill would have affected fluorochemical manufacturers outside of the state. Schwarzenegger said the compound should be reviewed by the newly established, and more comprehensive, state program.

Fluorotelomers 

Fluorotelomer-based products have been shown to degrade to PFOA over periods of decades; these studies could lead EPA to require DuPont and others to reformulate products with a value over $1 billion.

Health concerns

Toxicology data 
PFOA is a possible carcinogen, a possible liver toxicant, a possible developmental toxicant, and a possible immune system toxicant, and also exerts hormonal effects including alteration of thyroid hormone levels at very high concentrations  Animal studies show developmental toxicity from reduced birth size, physical developmental delays, endocrine disruption, and neonatal mortality. PFOA alters lipid metabolism. It is an agonist of PPARα and is a peroxisome proliferator in rodents contributing to a well understood form of oxidative stress. Humans are considered less susceptible to peroxisome proliferation than rodents. However, PFOA has been found to be a liver carcinogen in rainbow trout via a potential estrogenic mechanism, which may be more relevant to humans.

PFOA has been described as a member of a group of "classic non-genotoxic carcinogens". However, a provisional German assessment notes that a 2005 study found PFOA to be genotoxic via a peroxisome proliferation pathway that produced oxygen radicals in HepG2 cells, and a 2006 study demonstrated the induction and suppression of a broad range of genes; therefore, it states that the indirect genotoxic (and thus carcinogenic) potential of PFOA cannot be dismissed. An additional study has shown PFOA to be developmentally toxic, hepatotoxic, immunotoxic, and to have negative effects of thyroid hormone production. Criteria have been proposed that would allow PFOA, and other perfluorinated compounds, to be classified as "weakly non-specific genotoxic".

Endocrine disruption of sexual steroids 
In 2018, an in vitro toxicology study analyzed the disruptor effect of PFOS and PFOA on porcine ovarian cell steroidogenesis. Specifically, the study focused on secretion in porcine theca and granulosa cells, controlling gonadotropic stimulation. Five ovaries were obtained and dissected to collect theca and granulosa cells.

The experimental design included: evaluation of PFOS and PFOA on basal steroid secretion, stimulation of LH on theca cells and FSH on granulosa cells, effect of PFOS and PFOA on steroidogenesis in the stimulated cells, quantification of steroid hormones by chemiluminescence, protein content determination, statistical analysis.

The treatment groups had 9 data points each, from which the mean and standard deviation were calculated. The control group had 15 data points. A multi-factor analysis of variance (ANOVA) and Tukey's test were used for the concentrations of P4, A4 and E2. The two groups were compared using a Student's "t", with statistical significance set at p < 0.05.

Results show the disruptor effect of PFOS and PFOA depends on cell type. PFOS and PFOA inhibit the secretion of steroid hormones in both theca cells and granulosa cells with gonadotropic stimulus. In cells without gonadotropic stimulus, PFOS inhibit theca cells but not granulosa, while PFOA inhibit granulosa cells but not theca. These differences are explained by the different types of PPARs in cell type. The study used concentrations below the range found in human blood circulation, suggesting that this may occur in human population. These results indicated PFOS and PFOA act as endocrine disruptors on ovarian cells which could affect subsequent sexual steroids.

Human data 
PFOA is resistant to degradation by natural processes such as metabolism, hydrolysis, photolysis, or biodegradation and has been found to persist in the environment. PFOA is found in environmental and biological fluids as the anion perfluorooctanoate. PFOA can be absorbed from ingestion and can penetrate skin. The acid headgroup of PFOA enables binding to proteins with fatty acid or hormone substrates such as serum albumin, liver fatty acid-binding protein, and the nuclear receptors PPARα and possibly CAR.

In animals, PFOA is mainly present in the liver, blood, and kidneys. PFOA does not accumulate in fat tissue, unlike traditional organohalogen persistent organic pollutants. In humans, PFOA has an average elimination half-life of about three years. Because of this long half-life, PFOA has the potential to bioaccumulate.

The levels of PFOA exposure in humans vary widely. While an average American might have 3 or 4 parts per billion of PFOA present in their blood serum, individuals occupationally exposed to PFOA have had blood serum levels over 100,000 parts per billion (100 parts per million or 0.01%) recorded. In a study of individuals living around DuPont's Washington Works plant, those who had no occupational exposure had a median blood serum level of 329 parts per billion while the median of those with occupational exposure was 775 parts per billion. While no amount of PFOA in humans is legally recognized as harmful, DuPont was "not satisfied" with data showing their Chinese workers accumulated an average of about 2,250 parts per billion of PFOA in their blood from a starting average of around 50 parts per billion less than a year prior.

In late 2012, scientists at Emory University compared health risks in workers at a DuPont chemical plant in West Virginia with high PFOA exposure to the risks of the same diseases in other regional DuPont factory workers and in the US population. In comparison with the other DuPont workers, workers at the high-PFOA plant were at roughly three times the risk of dying of mesothelioma or chronic kidney disease, and roughly twice the risk of dying of diabetes mellitus. Workers were at similarly elevated risk for kidney cancer and for non-cancer kidney diseases. In rodents, PFOA concentrates in the kidneys.

Consumers 
Single cross-sectional studies on consumers have been published noting multiple associations. Blood serum levels of PFOA were associated with an increased time to pregnancy—or "infertility"—in a 2009 study. PFOA exposure was associated with decreased semen quality, increased serum alanine aminotransferase levels, and increased occurrence of thyroid disease. In a study of 2003–2004 US samples, a higher (9.8 milligram per deciliter) total cholesterol level was observed when the highest quartile was compared to the lowest. Along with other related compounds, PFOA exposure was associated with an increased risk of attention deficit hyperactivity disorder (ADHD) in a study of US children aged 12–15. In a paper presented at the 2009 annual meeting of the International Society of Environmental Epidemiology, PFOA appeared to act as an endocrine disruptor by a potential mechanism on breast maturation in young girls. A C8 Science Panel status report noted an association between exposure in girls and a later onset of puberty.

PFOA exposure and incident cancer research

Extensive research on PFOA and its role in the causal pathway of cancers exists for animals, however human studies are rare—most studies are mortality studies, which have small sample sizes.  A longitudinal study focused on residents living in Mid-Ohio Valley concluded that PFOA concentrations are positively associated with kidney and testicular cancers [hazard ratio = 1.10 and 1.34, respectively, for a 1-unit increase in log-transformed serum PFOA]. The study consisted of 32,254 residents with 2,507 reported cancer diagnoses occurring during study period. PFOA serum concentrations were measured at baseline and three to six year follow-up meetings. Retrospective yearly PFOA serum levels were estimated for each subject from 1952 through 2011.

Initial subject recruitment was performed using eligibility criteria and surveys—subjects were eligible if they lived or worked in one of the six contaminated water districts for at least one year between 1950 and December 3, 2004. Follow-up surveys were administered and remaining subjects (completion of at least one survey) were then included in the analysis dataset—selection bias was assessed and the final subjects did not differ significantly from the original population.

Retrospective PFOA serum concentrations were calculated using the published method of Shin et al. 2011a, 2011b). Historical regional data including emission rates by the DuPont facility, temporal patterns and groundwater flow are incorporated in the model as well as individual specific occupational exposure level was included. A job-exposure matrix was developed to assess estimated PFOA levels for workers across times and job roles.

Incident data was self-reported by study participants and followed up with a medical chart review. Cancer diagnoses were verified using Ohio/West Virginia cancer registries.

A proportional hazards regression model was used for each cancer type with the cancer as the outcome and PFOA serum level included as a time-varying covariate. Participants were followed from age 20 (or age in 1952) to the age of cancer diagnosis. Models were adjusted for time-varying- smoking and alcohol consumption, as well as sex, education and five-year birth cohort. The outcome of PFOA serum level was log-transformed due to the scarcity of very high cumulative exposure values.

Participants who worked at the DuPont facility had higher PFOA serum levels and higher estimated annual PFOA levels than subjects who never worked at the facility. After cancer diagnosis validation, thyroid, kidney and testicular cancer risk were found to increase with an increase in the PFOA serum concentration (log-transformed), with testicular cancer being significantly associated (α =0.05). The results are consistent with previous mortality analyses performed using DuPont data. There is a positive exposure-response trend for cancer incidence and PFOA serum levels. Kidney and testicular cancer are of interest given that animal studies have found that PFOA is distributed mainly in the kidneys and because PFOA has been found to induce testicular tumors in rats.

Impact of in utero exposure on reproductive organs

Due to the fact that PFOA is able to readily pass through the placental barrier, exposure is of particular concern during in utero development. Numerous studies have analyzed the impacts of PFOA on fetal development of reproductive organs. One study that followed a Danish pregnancy cohort suggests that in utero exposure to PFOA could be associated with lower levels of sperm concentration and total sperm count in adult males, reduced testicular size, and higher adjusted levels of luteinizing hormone and follicle-stimulating hormone. In utero PFOA exposure is also demonstrated to impact female development. For example, a study following a Danish population-based cohort found a 5.3 month later age of menarche in girls exposed to higher levels of PFOA in utero. Delayed onset of menarche is associated with lower bone mineral density and may have psychosocial impacts.

Other impacts on exposure in utero

PFOA exposure on thyroid function has also been a topic of concern, and has found to negatively impact thyroid stimulating hormone even at low levels when exposed during fetal development. PFOA is also shown to have obesogenic effects, and an experimental study found a positive correlation to low-dose prenatal exposure of PFOA and prevalence of overweight and high waist circumference in females at age 20. A correlation between in utero PFOA exposure and mental performance has yet to be established, as many studies have resulted in insignificant results. For example, a study conducted near Parkersburg, West Virginia did not find a significant association between in utero PFOA exposure and performance of math skills or reading performance in children ages 6 to 12 living in the PFOA-contaminated water district. Based on a cohort study conducted in the Mid-Ohio Valley, no clear association was found between prenatal exposure to PFOA and birth defects, although a possible association with brain defects was observed and requires further research and assessment.

PFOA has been associated with signs of reduced fetal growth including lower birth weight. However, other studies have not replicated the lower birth weight finding including a study on the DuPont exposed community. Extrapolated epidemiological data suggests a slight association between PFOA exposure and low birth weight. This was consistent based on blood levels of PFOA metabolites regardless of the geographic residence of subjects. Generally, the findings among human fetuses exposed to the chemical were considerably less drastic than what was seen in mice studies. Because of this, studies linking exposure to low birth weight can be considered inconclusive. PFOA exposure in the Danish general population was not associated with an increased risk of prostate, bladder, pancreatic, or liver cancer. Maternal PFOA levels were not associated with an offspring's increased risk of hospitalization due to infectious diseases, behavioral and motor coordination problems, or delays in reaching developmental milestones.

Employees and DuPont exposed community 
In 2010, the three members of the C8 Science Panel published a review of the epidemiological evidence on PFOA exposure in Environmental Health Perspectives. Insufficient evidence exists to conclude PFOA causes adverse health effects in humans, but consistent evidence exists on associations with higher cholesterol and uric acid. Whether or not these potential effects result in an increase in cardiovascular disease is unknown. Further data on the 69,030 member cohort that is being studied by the panel is scheduled for release through 2012. A 2011 epidemiological study demonstrated "probable link" between PFOA and kidney cancer, testicular cancer, thyroid disease, high cholesterol, pre-eclampsia and ulcerative colitis.

Facial birth defects, an effect observed in rat offspring, occurred with the children of two out of seven female DuPont employees from the Washington Works facility from 1979 to 1981. Bucky Bailey is one of the affected individuals; DuPont, however, does not accept any liability from the toxicity of PFOA. While 3M sent DuPont results from a study that showed birth defects to rats administered PFOA and DuPont moved the women out of the Teflon production unit, subsequent animal testing led DuPont to conclude there was no reproductive risk to women, and they were returned to the production unit. However, data released in March 2009 on the community around DuPont's Washington Works plant showed "a modest, imprecise indication of an elevation in risk ... above the 90th percentile ... based on 12 cases in the uppermost category", which was deemed "suggestive of a possible relationship" between PFOA exposure and birth defects.

Legal actions

International action: Stockholm Convention 
PFOA was proposed for listing under the Stockholm Convention on Persistent Organic Pollutants in 2015, and on May 10, 2019, PFOA, its salts, and PFOA-related compounds were added to Annex A of the Stockholm Convention by the Conference of the Parties. Several hundred salts and precursors of PFOA fall within the scope of the restriction. A few specific exemptions remained. Among them is a time-bound exemption for PFOA in fire-fighting foam.

Industry and legal actions 
DuPont has used PFOA for over 50 years at its Washington Works plant. Area residents sued DuPont in August 2001 and claimed DuPont released PFOA in excess of their community guideline of 1 part per billion resulting in lower property values and increased risk of illness. The class was certified by Wood Circuit Court Judge George W. Hill. As part of the settlement, DuPont has paid for blood tests and health surveys of residents believed to be affected. Participants numbered 69,030 in the study, which was reviewed by three epidemiologists—the C8 Science Panel—to determine if any health effects are the likely result of exposure.

On December 13, 2005, DuPont announced a settlement with the EPA in which DuPont would pay US$10.25 million in fines and an additional US$6.25 million for two supplemental environmental projects without any admission of liability.

On September 30, 2008, Chief Judge Joseph R. Goodwin of the United States District Court for the Southern District of West Virginia denied the certification of a class of Parkersburg residents exposed to PFOA from DuPont's facility because they did not "show the common individual injuries needed to certify a class action". On September 28, 2009, Judge Goodwin dismissed the claims of those residents except for medical monitoring. By 2015, more than three thousand plaintiffs have filed personal-injury lawsuits against DuPont. In 2017, DuPont reached a $670.7 million cash settlement related to 3,550 personal injury lawsuits tied to PFOA contamination of drinking water in the Parkersburg area. Chemours, which was spun off from DuPont in 2015, agreed to pay half the settlement. Both companies denied any wrongdoing.

U.S. federal government actions 
In 2002, a panel of toxicologists, including several from EPA, proposed a level of 150 ppb for drinking water in the PFOA contaminated area around DuPont's Washington Works plant. This initially proposed level was much higher than any known environmental concentration and was over 2,000 times the level EPA eventually settled on for the drinking water health advisory.

In July 2004, EPA filed a suit against DuPont alleging "widespread contamination" of PFOA near the Parkersburg, West Virginia plant "at levels exceeding the company's community exposure guidelines;" the suit also alleged that "DuPont had—over a 20 year period—repeatedly failed to submit information on adverse effects (in particular, information on liver enzyme alterations and birth defects in offspring of female Parkersburg workers)."

In October 2005, a USFDA study was published revealing PFOA and PFOA precursor chemicals in food contact and PTFE products.

On January 25, 2006, EPA announced a voluntary program with several chemical companies to reduce PFOA and PFOA precursor emissions by the year 2015.

On February 15, 2005, EPA's Science Advisory Board (SAB) voted to recommended that PFOA should be considered a "likely human carcinogen".

On May 26, 2006, EPA's SAB addressed a letter to Administrator Stephen L. Johnson. Three-quarters of advisers thought the stronger "likely to be carcinogenic" descriptor was warranted, in opposition to EPA's own PFOA hazard descriptor of "suggestive evidence of carcinogenicity, but not sufficient to assess human carcinogenic potential".

On November 21, 2006, EPA ordered DuPont to offer alternative drinking water or treatment for public or private water users living near DuPont's Washington Works plant in West Virginia (and in Ohio), if the level of PFOA detected in drinking water is equal to or greater than 0.5 parts per billion. This measure sharply lowered the previous action level of 150 parts per billion that was established in March 2002.

According to a May 23, 2007, Environmental Science & Technology Online article, U.S. Food and Drug Administration research regarding food contact papers as a potential source of PFOA to humans is ongoing.

In November 2007, the Centers for Disease Control and Prevention (CDC) published data on PFOA concentrations comparing 1999–2000 vs. 2003–2004 NHANES samples.

On January 15, 2009, EPA set a provisional health advisory level of 0.4 ppb in drinking water.

On May 19, 2016, EPA lowered the drinking water health advisory level to 0.07 ppb for PFOA and PFOS. In June 2022 the agency issued updated advisories, stating that "some negative health effects may occur with concentrations of PFOA or PFOS in water that are near zero and below EPA's ability to detect at this time." EPA also issued new health advisories for GenX and PFBS.

In March 2021 EPA announced that it will develop drinking water standards for PFOA and PFOS in public water systems.

In October 2021 the EPA proposed to designate PFOA and PFOS as hazardous substances in its PFAS Strategic Roadmap. In September 2022 the EPA proposed to designate as hazardous substances under the Superfund Comprehensive Environmental Response, Compensation, and Liability Act of 1980 (CERCLA).

U.S. state government actions

New Jersey 
In 2007 the New Jersey Department of Environmental Protection (NJDEP) announced that it found PFOA at "elevated levels in the system's drinking water near DuPont's massive Chambers Works chemical plant". 

In 2018 the state published a drinking water standard for PFNA. Public water systems in New Jersey are required to meet a maximum contaminant level (MCL) standard of 13 ppt. 

In 2019 New Jersey filed lawsuits against the owners of two plants that had manufactured PFASs (the Chambers Works and the Parlin plant in Sayreville), and two plants that were cited for water pollution from other chemicals. The companies cited are DuPont, Chemours and 3M.

In 2020 the NJDEP set a PFOA standard at 14 ppt and a PFOS standard at 13 ppt.

New York 
In 2018 the New York State Department of Health adopted drinking water standards of 10 ppt for PFOA and 10 ppt for PFOS, effective in 2019 after a public comment period.

Michigan 
In November 2017, the Michigan PFAS Action Response Team (MPART) was created to address growing pollution concerns after multiple sites contaminated by PFAS were identified. MPART is a multi-agency team tasked with investigating PFAS contamination sites and sources in the state, protecting drinking water, enhancing interagency communication and keeping the public informed.

In January 2018, Michigan established a legally enforceable groundwater cleanup level of 70 ppt for both PFOA and PFOS.  Two science advisory committees were also created and joined MPART to "coordinate and review medical and environmental health, PFAS science and develop evidence-based recommendations".

In August 2020, the Michigan Department Department of Environment, Great Lakes, and Energy adopted stricter drinking water standards in the form of MCLs, lowering acceptable levels from the 2018 enforceable groundwater cleanup levels of 70 ppt to 8 ppt for PFOA and 16 ppt for PFOS and adding MCLs for 5 previously unregulated PFAS compounds PFNA, PFHxA, PFHxS, PFBS, and HFPO-DA.

Minnesota 
In 2007, the Minnesota Department of Health lowered its Health Based Value for PFOA in drinking water from 1.0 ppb to 0.5 ppb, where "the sources are landfilled industrial wastes from a 3M manufacturing plant".

European action 
PFOA contaminated waste was incorporated into soil improver and spread on agricultural land in Germany, leading to PFOA drinking water contamination of up to 0.519 parts per billion. The German Federal Environmental Agency issued guidelines for the sum of PFOA and PFOS concentrations in drinking water: 0.1 parts per billion for precaution and 0.3 parts per billion for a threshold. Residents were found to have a 6–8 factor increase of PFOA serum levels over unexposed Germans, with average PFOA concentrations in the 22–27 parts per billion range. An expert panel concluded that "concentrations were considered too low to cause overt adverse health effects in the exposed population".

In the Netherlands, after questions by members of Parliament, the minister of Environment ordered a study into the potential exposure to PFOA of people living in the vicinity of the DuPont factory in Dordrecht. The report was published in March 2016 and concluded that "prior to 2002 residents were exposed to levels of PFOA at which health effects could not be ruled out". As a result of this, the government commissioned several further studies, including blood tests and measurements in drinking water.

PFOA was identified as a PBT substance in the EU in 2013. It was then included in the candidate list of substances of very high concern. In 2017, PFOA, its salts and PFOA-related substances were added to annex XVII (restriction) of the REACH Regulation.

The EU adopted the listing of PFOA in Annex A of the Stockholm Convention with Commission Delegated Regulation (EU) 2020/784 of 8 April 2020 and introduced a limit value of 0,025 mg/kg for PFOA including its salts, and at 1 mg/kg for the individual PFOA-related compounds or a combination of those compounds. They also included some specific exemptions. Among them is a time-bound exemption for PFOA in fire-fighting foam.

Australian action 
On August 10, 2016, Australian litigation funder IMF Bentham announced an agreement to fund a class action led by the law firm Gadens against the Australian Department of Defence for economic losses to homeowners, fishers, and farmers resulting from the use of aqueous film forming foam (containing PFOA) at RAAF Base Williamtown.

See also 
 Timeline of events related to per- and polyfluoroalkyl substances (PFAS)

References

External links 

 US EPA: Per- and Polyfluoroalkyl Substances (PFAS) – Overview, regulatory actions, tools & resources
 Sustained Outrage Blog – C8 (PFOA) Category  published by the Charleston Gazette
 Internet Movie Database (IMDB) listing The Devil We Know
 Callie Lyons blog on C8, author of Stain-Resistant, Nonstick, Waterproof, and Lethal: The Hidden Dangers of C8
 Perfluorooctanoic Acid (PFOA); Fluorinated Telomers enforceable consent agreement development
 Perfluorinated substances and their uses in Sweden
 Chain of Contamination: The Food Link, Perfluorinated Chemicals (PFCs) Incl. PFOS & PFOA

Anionic surfactants
Perfluorocarboxylic acids
IARC Group 2B carcinogens
PBT substances
Persistent organic pollutants under the Stockholm Convention